Orange Township is one of nine townships in Fayette County, Indiana. As of the 2010 census, its population was 736 and it contained 296 housing units.

History
Orange Township was organized in 1822. Many of its early settlers were natives of Orange County, North Carolina, hence the name.

Geography

Cities and towns
 Glenwood (southeast edge)

Unincorporated community
 Orange

Adjacent townships
 Fairview Township (north)
 Connersville Township (northeast)
 Columbia Township (east)
 Laurel Township, Franklin County (southeast)
 Posey Township, Franklin County (south)
 Noble Township, Rush County (west)
 Union Township, Rush County (northwest)

Major highways
 Indiana State Road 44

Cemeteries
The township contains two cemeteries: Old Friends Church and Orange-North.

References
 United States Census Bureau cartographic boundary files
 U.S. Board on Geographic Names

External links
 Indiana Township Association
 United Township Association of Indiana

Townships in Fayette County, Indiana
Townships in Indiana